This is a list of Spanish television related events in 1983.

Events 
 16 February: Euskal Telebista, Basque Country’s Regional Television channel is launched. It is the first time a Television Network other than the State-owned TVE broadcasts in Spain.
 23 April: Remedios Amaya and her song Quien maneja mi barca scored nule points at the Eurovision Song Contest 1983 in Munich, being ranked last.
 23 April: Punk Music band Las Vulpes perform the song Me gusta ser una zorra (I Like Being a Slut) during the show Caja de ritmos, directed and hosted by Carlos Tena. Angry reaction against the lyrics even with political consequences as the issue is studied by the Parliament. The show is cancelled.
 6 July: Inauguration of TVE new studios in San Cugat del Vallés (Barcelona).
 21 September: José Luis Balbín is dismissed as Head of the TVE News Department.

Debuts

Television shows

La 1

Ending this year

La 1

Foreign series debuts in Spain

Births 
 2 January - Lidia San José, actress
 21 January - Paula Prendes, actress & hostess.
 9 February - Celia Freijeiro, actress
 10 February - Nagore Robles, hostess & pundit
 4 July - Miguel Ángel Muñoz, actor & cantante
 22 July - Álex Gadea, actor
 5 September - Patricia Pardo, hostess
 7 November - Alberto Casado, host
 30 November - Carla Nieto, actress

Deaths 
 17 December - José Orjas, actor, 77
 Tota Alba, actress, 68

See also
 1983 in Spain
 List of Spanish films of 1983

References 

1983 in Spanish television